Franco (Gian) Manzecchi (September 10, 1931, Ravenna – March 25, 1979, Konstanz) was an Italian drummer.

Biography 
Manzecchi's older brother Gino was also a trumpeter and drummer. He moved from his hometown Ravenna, Italy, to Bologna, then to Vienna, Austria, and Saint Moritz, Switzerland, before he coincidentally went to Paris, France, in early 1957 and settled down there, playing with various ensembles. After a heart surgery in 1976 he had to partially quit music and retired to Lake Constance, Germany, with his German wife and son Patrick (who is a renowned jazz drummer himself) before passing away two years later. He is most famous for working and recording with Chet Baker, Eric Dolphy, Larry Young, Clark Terry, Bill Coleman, Lou Bennett, Mal Waldron and more.

Discography
 Chet Baker, Brussels 1964 (Landscape, 1992)
 Nathan Davis, Live in Paris (Sam, 2018)
 Jack Dieval & Art Simmons, Ambiance Pour 2 Pianos Piano Duet (Polydor, 1966)
 Eric Dolphy, Naima (Jazzway, 1987)
 Eric Dolphy, Unrealized Tapes (West Wind, 1988)
 Andre Hodeir, Anna Livia Plurabelle (Philips, 1966)
 Clark Terry, At the Montreux Jazz Festival (Polydor, 1970)
 Eraldo Volonte, Free and Loose (Windsor, 1968)
 Larry Young, In Paris (Resonance, 2016)

References 

1931 births
1979 deaths
20th-century Italian people
Italian jazz drummers
Male drummers
People from Ravenna
20th-century Italian musicians
20th-century drummers
20th-century Italian male musicians
Male jazz musicians